Bullia terebraeformis is a species of sea snail, a marine gastropod mollusk in the family Nassariidae, the Nassa mud snails or dog whelks.

Description

Distribution

References

 Gofas, S.; Afonso, J.P.; Brandào, M. (Ed.). (S.a.). Conchas e Moluscos de Angola = Coquillages et Mollusques d'Angola. [Shells and molluscs of Angola]. Universidade Agostinho / Elf Aquitaine Angola: Angola. 140 pp.

External links
 Dautzenberg P. (1912) Mission Gruvel sur la côte occidentale d'Afrique (1909-1910): Mollusques marins. Annales de l'Institut Océanographique, Paris, (Nouvelle Série) 5(3): 1-111, pl. 1-3.
 Adam, W.; Knudsen, J. (1984). Révision des Nassariidae (Mollusca : Gastropoda Prosobranchia) de l'Afrique occidentale. Bulletin de l'Institut Royal des Sciences Naturelles de Belgique. 55(9): 1-95, 5 pl.

Nassariidae
Gastropods described in 1912